The Best American Short Stories 1996, a volume in The Best American Short Stories series, was edited by Katrina Kenison and by guest editor John Edgar Wideman.

Short stories included

References

1996 anthologies
Fiction anthologies
Short Stories 1996
Houghton Mifflin books